Chunwei (Old Chinese: ZS: *djun-ɢʷi; B-S: *[d]u[r]-ɢʷij) is a name associated with the Xiongnu, a tribal confederation of nomadic peoples who, according to ancient Chinese sources, inhabited the eastern Eurasian Steppe from the 3rd century BC to the late 1st century AD.

Overview
In Sima Qian's Records of the Grand Historian , the Xiongnu 匈奴 were mentioned as Shanrong 山戎, Xianyun 獫狁, and Hunyu 葷粥 "since before the time of Tang [i.e. Emperor Yao (堯)] and Yu [i.e. Emperor Shun (舜)]" (唐虞以上).

3rd century scholar Wei Zhao also identified the name Chunwei with the name of the Xiongnu: “During the Han (206 BC-220 AD) they were called Xiongnu 匈奴, and the Hunyu 葷粥 is just another name for the same people, and similarly, the Xunyu 獯粥 is just another transcription of Chunwei 淳維, their ancestor’s name”. In Shiji jijie (史記集解) "Collected Explanations on Historical Records" Liu Song historian Pei Yin (裴駰) quoted Jin Zhuo's statement that "In Yao's time they were called Hunyu; in Zhou's time they were called Xianyun; in Qin's time they were called Xiongnu." In Shiji Suoyin (史記索隱) "Seeking the Obscure in the Records", Tang history Sima Zhen quoted from Fengsu Tongyi (風俗通義) "Comprehensive Meaning of Customs and Mores", by Ying Shao 應劭, that “In the time of Yin, they were called Xunyu [獯粥], which was changed to Xiongnu [匈奴]”; however, this quote no longer exists in Fengsu Tongyi's received text.

Sima Qian wrote that the 匈奴 Xiongnu's ruling clan were descendants of Chunwei (淳維), a descendant of Lord Xia (夏后氏), aka Yu the Great.  Chunwei is alleged to be a son of Jie of Xia (Xia Dynasty's last ruler). Sima Zhen stated that Yue Chan (樂產) wrote in now-lost Guadipu (括地譜) "Register of the Encompassing Lands" that: “Jie, (ruler of) the House of Xia lived an immoral life. Tang exiled him to Mingtiao, he died there three years later. His son Xunyu 獯粥 married his concubines and they wandered far away to the northern wilderness in search of pasture lands, and then in the Middle Kingdom they were mentioned as Xiongnu 匈奴.” Sima Zhen also quoted Zhang Yan (張晏)'s statement that “Chunwei, during the Yin era, fled to the northern borders.”

However, Goldin (2011) points out chronological difficulties resulting from attempts to identify Chunwei 淳維 with Hunyu 葷粥 ~ Xunyu 獯粥. If one would literally interpret "since before the time of Tang [i.e. Emperor Yao] and Yu [i.e. Emperor Shun]" (唐虞以上) (when the Hunyu supposedly had been in existence) in Sima Qian's Shiji and would identify Chunwei 葷粥 with Hunyu 葷粥 ~ Xunyu 獯粥, those would result in Chunwei, allegedly a son of Jie of Xia dynasty, living before instead of many generations after Yao and Shun, both of whom had lived and ruled before the Xia dynasty. Moreover, Goldin (2011) reconstructs the Old Chinese pronunciations of Hunyu 葷粥 ~ Xunyu 獯粥 as *xur-luk, 獫狁 as hram′-lun′, and 匈奴 as *xoŋ-NA; and comments all three names are "manifestly unrelated"; he further states that sound changes made the names more superficially similar than they really had been, and prompted later historians and commentators to conclude that those names must have referred to one same people in different epochs, even though people during the Warring States period would never have been thus misled.

Notes

References

Citations

Sources 
 Zhonghan Wang, Outlines of Ethnic Groups in China, Taiyuan, Shanxi Education Press, 2004, p. 133,

See also
 List of past Chinese ethnic groups

Ancient China
Xiongnu